... Human Skin Over Animal Fur... is an EP by Gnaw Their Tongues, released in July 2007 by Epicene Sound Replica. The album would appear in its entirety on the compilation Collected Atrocities 2005–2008, released in 2015.

Track listing

Personnel
Adapted from the ... Human Skin Over Animal Fur... liner notes.
 Maurice de Jong (as Mories) – vocals, instruments, recording, cover art

Release history

References

External links 
 

2007 EPs
Gnaw Their Tongues albums